New Berlin is a city in Guadalupe County, Texas, United States. The population was 511 at the  census. New Berlin is a German-Texan town and part of the Texas-German belt region.

Geography

New Berlin is located in southwestern Guadalupe County at  (29.462366, –98.100593), to the east of Cibolo Creek.

History

New Berlin was founded in 1868 by German immigrants who came to the area. It was named after the German capital, Berin. Carl August Edward "Ed" Tewes is considered the founding father. Sutherland Springs Church shooter Devin Kelley shot himself near the city after massacring 27 victims and being pursued by two armed townspeople. Historic Brietzke Station is now a barbecue restaurant. The town is also home to a beer joint, another restaurant, and a feed store.

Demographics

As of the census of 2000, there were 467 people, 167 households, and 135 families residing in the city. The population density was 164.1 people per square mile (63.3/km). There were 178 housing units at an average density of 62.6/sq mi (24.1/km). The racial makeup of the city was 98.07% White, 0.64% Native American, 0.86% from other races, and 0.43% from two or more races. Hispanic or Latino of any race were 7.28% of the population.

There were 167 households, out of which 42.5% had children under the age of 18 living with them, 70.1% were married couples living together, 8.4% had a female householder with no husband present, and 18.6% were non-families. 18.0% of all households were made up of individuals, and 8.4% had someone living alone who was 65 years of age or older. The average household size was 2.80 and the average family size was 3.16.

In the city, the population was spread out, with 29.1% under the age of 18, 5.6% from 18 to 24, 30.8% from 25 to 44, 22.5% from 45 to 64, and 12.0% who were 65 years of age or older. The median age was 37 years. For every 100 females, there were 93.8 males. For every 100 females age 18 and over, there were 99.4 males.

The median income for a household in the city was $52,250, and the median income for a family was $66,607. Males had a median income of $40,521 versus $29,688 for females. The per capita income for the city was $22,779. About 2.1% of families and 4.0% of the population were below the poverty line, including none of those under age 18 and 12.0% of those age 65 or over.

Education
New Berlin is served by the Marion Independent School District.

References

External links
City of New Berlin official website

Cities in Texas
Cities in Guadalupe County, Texas
Greater San Antonio
Populated places established in 1868